Trim or TRIM may refer to:

Cutting
 Cutting or trimming small pieces off something to remove them
 Book trimming, a stage of the publishing process
 Pruning, trimming as a form of pruning often used on trees

Decoration
 Trim (sewing), ornaments applied to clothing or other textiles
 Hatmaking#Types, trimmings, ornaments fastened to women's hats
 Trim package, a set of cosmetic embellishments to a car or other vehicle
 Trim, a kind of decorative molding, typically around an opening

Places
 Trim, County Meath, a town in Ireland
 Trim Castle, a castle in Ireland
 Trim Station (OC Transpo), a bus station in Ottawa, Canada
 Trim Road, Ottawa, Canada

Science and technology

 HP TRIM Records Management System, computer software
 Trim (computing), a solid-state drive erasure optimization command
 Trimming (computer programming), using a computer command to trim whitespace from the ends of text
 Transport of ions in matter, a computer program
 Tripartite motif family, a protein family
 Trim, adjustment of an electronic trimmer
 Transfusion-related immunomodulation, a potential adverse effect of blood transfusion

Transport
 Automobile trim - a feature of a car
 Trim tab, in aircraft, small surfaces part of a larger control surface
 Trim, adjustment of a sail on a ship or boat
 Trim (sailing ballast), adjustment of sailing ballast
 Trim (ship), the variation from horizontal on the longitudinal axis
 Trim, adjustment of a vessel's attitude, dynamic trimming

Entertainment
 Trim height, the height in a theatre at which a batten is used
"Trim" a song by Underworld from their album A Hundred Days Off
 Trim (rapper) (born 1984), English grime MC from London
 Trimmed, a 1922 film starring Hoot Gibson

Other uses
 Corporal Trim, a fictional character in The Life and Opinions of Tristram Shandy, Gentleman
 Editing
 Trimming, editing a posting style in online discourse
 Trim (cat), Matthew Flinders' cat, the first feline to circumnavigate Australia
 Trade Related Investment Measures, rules of the World Trade Organization

People with the surname
 Albert Trim (1875-1954), Australian rules footballer
 Andrew Trim (born 1968), Australian Olympic athlete
 David Trim (born 1969), Indian historian
 John Trim (cricketer) (1915-1960), West Indian cricketer
 John Trim (linguist) (1924-2013), English linguist
 Judith Trim (1943-2001), English studio potter
 Kibwe Trim (born 1984), Trinidad and Tobago businessman and former basketball player
 Michael Trim (television producer) (born 1945), American cinematographer
 Mike Trim (born 1945), English artist
 Ted Trim (1907-1989), Australian rules footballer

See also
 Trimmed mean, in statistics
 Trimmed estimator, in statistics
 Trimmer (disambiguation)